The Andean foreland basins or Sub-Andean basins are a group of foreland basins located in the western half of South America immediately east of the Andes mountains. The Andean foreland basins in the Amazon River's catchment area are known as the Amazonian foreland basins.

In part sediment accumulation, uplift and subsidence of the Andean foreland basins is controlled by transverse zones of "structural accommodation", likely corresponding to ancient continent-wide faults. From the Bolivian Orocline (20° S, also known as Arica Deflection or Arica Elbow) north these zones of accommodation runs with a NEE-SWW orientation and south of the orocline they run with a NW-SE orientation. The Andean foreland basins in Bolivia have largely accumulated continental sediments, most of them of clastic nature.

Beginning in 1920 the Ecuadorian and Peruvian basins were explored for petroleum and in the 1970s their hydrocarbon production increased greatly.

References

Further reading 

 
 
 

Andes
Foreland basins
Sedimentary basins of Argentina
Sedimentary basins of Bolivia
Sedimentary basins of Brazil
Sedimentary basins of Colombia
Sedimentary basins of Ecuador
Sedimentary basins of Paraguay
Sedimentary basins of Peru
Sedimentary basins of Venezuela
Sedimentary basins of South America